Piiparinen is a surname. Notable people with the surname include:

Garry Piiparinen, American politician
Niko Piiparinen (born 1989), Finnish ice hockey player